Acetyl iodide is an organoiodine compound with the formula CH3COI.  It is a colourless liquid. It is formally derived from acetic acid.  Although far rarer in the laboratory than the related acetyl bromide and acetyl chloride, acetyl iodide is produced, transiently at least, on a far larger scale than any other acid halide. Specifically, it is generated by the carbonylation of methyl iodide in the Cativa and Monsanto processes, which are the main industrial processes that generate acetic acid.  It is also an intermediate in the production of acetic anhydride from methyl acetate.

Upon treatment with carboxylic acids, acetyl iodide does not exhibit reactions typical of acyl halides, such as acetyl chloride.  Instead, acetyl iodide undergoes iodide/hydroxide exchange with most carboxylic acids:

References 

Acyl iodides